Community Theatre or Community Theater may refer to:

Community theatre, the putting on of generally amateur theatre productions

In the United States
Community Theatre (Pine Bluff, Arkansas), listed on the National Register of Historic Places (NRHP) in Arkansas
Community Theater (Newburg, Missouri), listed on the NRHP in Missouri
Community Theatre (Kingston, New York), listed on the NRHP in Ulster County, New York

Lists of theatres